Loren C. Carpenter (born February 7, 1947) is a computer graphics researcher and developer.

Biography 
He was a co-founder and chief scientist of Pixar Animation Studios. He is the co-inventor of the Reyes rendering algorithm and is one of the authors of the PhotoRealistic RenderMan software which implements Reyes and renders all of Pixar's movies. Following Disney's acquisition of Pixar, Carpenter became a Senior Research Scientist at Disney Research. He retired in early 2014.

In around 1967 Carpenter began work at Boeing Computer Services (a part of aircraft maker Boeing) in Seattle, Washington. During his time there Carpenter studied for a B.S. in mathematics (1974) and an M.S. in Computer Science (1976), both from the University of Washington. Some of his work concerned using computer technology to improve Boeing's mechanical design processes, which were still entirely done by hand on paper.

On July 14, 1980, he gave a presentation at the SIGGRAPH conference, in which he showed "Vol Libre", a 2-minute computer generated movie. This showcased his software for generating and rendering fractally generated landscapes, and was met with a standing ovation, and (as Carpenter had hoped) he was immediately invited to work at  Lucasfilm's Computer Division (which would become Pixar).  There Carpenter worked on the "genesis effect" scene of Star Trek II: The Wrath of Khan, which  featured an entire fractally-landscaped planet.

He and his wife Rachel founded Cinematrix, a company that researches computer-assisted interactive audience participation.

Carpenter invented the A-buffer hidden surface determination algorithm.

The PXR24 compression scheme used in Industrial Light & Magic's Open EXR file format is based on Carpenter's work.

In 2006 made improvements to the popular Mersenne Twister random number generator.

Computer animation
Star Trek II: The Wrath of Khan (1982) computer graphics: Industrial Light & Magic
André and Wally B. (1984) 3D rendering
Tin Toy (1988) elf
Toy Story (1995) modeling & animation system development/modeling team/renderman software development/shader team
A Bug's Life (1998) modeling artist
Toy Story 2 (1999) rendering software engineer
Monsters, Inc. (2001) additional effects developer
Finding Nemo (2003) studio tools research and development
The Incredibles (2004) software engineering
Cars (2006) development team: Renderman
Ratatouille (2007) renderman development
WALL-E (2008): (theme parks: Pixar studio team
Up (2009) theme parks and 360: Pixar studio team
Toy Story 3 (2010) 360 group: Pixar studio team
Cars 2 (2011) 360 group: Pixar studio team
Brave (2012) 360 group: Pixar studio team
Monsters University (2013) researcher: software research and development, Pixar Studio Team

Awards
 1985, ACM SIGGRAPH Achievement Award.
 1992, Scientific and Technical Academy Award (Plaque) for his contributions to the motion picture industry through the invention and development of the RenderMan software.
 1994, Distinction by the Prix Ars Electronica jury for his entry Kinoetic Evolution in the category Interactive Art.
 1995, Fellow of the Association for Computing Machinery.
 2000, Academy Award of Merit (Statuette).
 2017, Cayman Islands International Film Festival Lifetime Achievement Award

Bibliography
 Loren Carpenter, "The A -buffer, an antialiased hidden surface method", ACM Siggraph Computer Graphics, vol. 18, no. 3, pp. 103–108, 1984
 Robert L. Cook, Loren Carpenter, and Edwin Catmull. "The Reyes image rendering architecture." Computer Graphics (SIGGRAPH '87 Proceedings), pp. 95–102.
 Robert L. Cook, Thomas K. Porter, Loren Carpenter, "Distributed ray tracing", ACM Siggraph Computer Graphics, vol. 18, no. 3, pp. 137–145, 1984

References

External links
Cinematrix
A chapter from Kevin Kelly's book Out of Control about Carpenter's Vol Libre animation.
Vol Libre

University of Washington College of Arts and Sciences alumni
Computer graphics professionals
Fellows of the Association for Computing Machinery
1947 births
Living people
Pixar people
People from Brighton, Michigan
Disney Research people
Recipients of the Scientific and Technical Academy Award of Merit